The 1949 Yale Bulldogs football team represented Yale University in the 1949 college football season.  The Bulldogs were led by second-year head coach Herman Hickman, played their home games at the Yale Bowl and finished the season with a 4–4 record.
The team was captained by Levi Jackson, the first African American  honored with the position.

Schedule

References

Yale
Yale Bulldogs football seasons
Yale Bulldogs football